is a 2000 Japanese anime film based on a manga of the same name by Kōsuke Fujishima, produced by AIC and distributed by Shochiku. It was directed by Hiroaki Gōda and written by Michiko Yokote and Yoshihiko Tomizawa. The film's theatrical release took place on October 21, 2000. The film was licensed by Geneon Entertainment in North America, MVM Films in the United Kingdom, and Madman Entertainment in Australia and New Zealand.

Plot

The story takes place during the third spring since Belldandy's arrival. Celestin, a former mentor of Belldandy, is released by Morgan Le Fay, and erases all memories of Keiichi from Belldandy to use her as a virus to hack the Yggdrasil computer in the heavens.

Morgan le Fay heads to the Lunar Prison on the Moon and releases the seal. She is able to make contact with a small mask that reveals that they must unite for their common goal.

On Earth, it is the start of the New Year at Nekomi Institute of Technology, and various clubs seek to recruit new members. The Motor Club is one of them, and tries to lure new applicants with a display of the vehicles they race with, including the new two-seater Keiichi Morisato and Belldandy will be using in an upcoming race. Many new members initially join, including Morgan in human form. However, most of them are scared away by Toraichi Tamiya and Otaki Aoyama.

That night, while the club members celebrate, Keiichi inadvertently finds himself in a compromising situation with club member Hasegawa. Belldandy runs outside, with Keiichi in pursuit. When Keiichi catches up to her, she apologizes; Keiichi simply smiles and comments upon the arrival of spring. Comforted, Belldandy smiles back and tells him in a flurry of cherry blossoms that she hopes she can spend all of her springs with him. Celestin, a former mentor of Belldandy, then appears. Urd flies in and angrily orders Celestin to step away from Belldandy. Refusing to step away, he turns Belldandy around and gives her a kiss on the lips, whereupon Belldandy collapses, much to everyone's shock. Urd then attacks him with a lightning bolt, but he has disappeared. At the temple, Urd finds out that Belldandy has been infected with a virus. Peorth calls to inform Urd that Yggdrasil has also been compromised by the virus, and isolates The Heavens from Earth as a security measure until it is stopped, meaning that Belldandy cannot receive treatment until the matter is resolved.

When she finally regains consciousness, Belldandy can not recall memories of Keiichi, even though she can identify Skuld and Urd immediately. Urd recognizes the symptoms as selective amnesia and informs Keiichi that all of Belldandy's memories after their first encounter must have been sealed. Proving Urd's speculation, Belldandy informs Keiichi that she may grant him one wish. After Skuld reprimands him, Keiichi craftily wishes that Belldandy's memories be restored, but as Yggdrasil is down, Belldandy finds that she cannot process the request. Skuld attempts to restore Belldandy's memory with a number of inventions, but the most they do is remind Belldandy to give Keiichi her business card. Unable to find an immediate solution, Keiichi decides to accept the current situation for the moment, and try to live as normally as possible.

When the Motor Club is told about Belldandy's condition, they are shocked, but also concerned about their upcoming race; the competition is a mixed-gender race. When Sora declines the opportunity, Morgan offers to take Belldandy's place. Unsure about her skill, the club gives her a trial-run with Keiichi; seeing them ride the bike causes some traces of memory to return to Belldandy.

Up to this point, Keiichi has managed to remain surprisingly stoic despite Belldandy's condition. However, as he drives back to the temple that night at dangerously high speeds, he is so immersed in his troubles that he subconsciously expects Belldandy to aid him in making a sharp turn, without realizing that those memories remain locked and this almost causes an accident. Realizing Keiichi's guilt stirs something in Belldandy's heart, perhaps a faint reminder of the love they once shared.

When Belldandy accidentally uncovers a photo album filled with pictures of the two at the temple, she realizes just how deeply her amnesia has affected Keiichi. Realizing the recent emptiness in his smiles inspires Belldandy to get to know him better, starting by opting to remain as Keiichi's partner in the upcoming race despite her amnesia. When an irritated Morgan hears about Belldandy's renewed resolve, she challenges Keiichi and Belldandy to a race, teaming up with Megumi at Keiichi's request. Despite Morgan's best efforts however, they are no match for the two, and what's more, the experience apparently unlocks more of Belldandy's memories.

That night, Belldandy accidentally overhears a discussion between Keiichi and her sisters regarding Celestine's role in the current crisis. Realizing that Celestine erased her memories and inserted the virus, Belldandy stumbles out into the night, shocked and confused. Taking advantage of the situation, Celestine lures Belldandy away and when Urd arrives, he uses the virus to turn Belldandy against her elder sister in combat. Keiichi and Skuld's arrival causes a massive amount of uncontrollable energy from Belldandy as she struggles to reaffirm her sense of self, knocking out everyone in the vicinity. Successfully finding the side of her that she hid away after Celestine's betrayal allows her to safely dissipate the energy, though she faints in the process. Skuld wakes up to find the locality ravaged in the aftermath of the battlefield. When she spots Celestine calmly stepping down the stairs, she summons Noble Scarlet and angrily knocks Celestine with a thunderbolt into a screen, causing water to flood. Keiichi awakens just in time to notice the oncoming wave, and rushes to cover Belldandy, so that he will take the brunt of the blow for her. Belldandy awakens to find Keiichi comatose on the ground and hysterically tries to revive him.

Back at the temple, Belldandy comes to her senses, but her heart is uneasy and believes that she has only served to bring suffering to Keiichi. Skuld assures her that, regardless of present circumstances, in all of the friends they have made and all the experiences they have been through, Keiichi and Belldandy have weathered all with smiles. Reassured, Belldandy falls into Skuld's lap, sparking concern from her, but Urd assures her that Belldandy is merely exhausted from the battle.

When Keiichi walks into the empty Motor Club clubhouse alone the next morning, he finds Morgan bleeding on the stairway from the battle. Disregarding her attempts to decline, Keiichi insists that she come with him to the hospital wing. While he treats the wound on her arm, Morgan cryptically asks him whether he could love her, telling him that in the world that is coming Belldandy will belong to Celestine. Before he can reply, she forcibly kisses him; unbeknownst to them, Belldandy sees them through the door. Due in part to her upset over this (seeing Morgan and Keiichi kissing) Belldandy prepares herself to accept the vaccine, which will destroy the virus in her, at the risk of erasing all her memories. In coordination with Heaven, the ceremony of administering the vaccine commences, but something goes wrong.

The virus inside Belldandy has been using her as a Trojan horse; since Goddesses are connected to Yggdrasil, it was able to infect the main system through her, although without direct access it was only able to make slow progress. The Heavens made direct access with Belldandy to administer the vaccine, unwittingly allowing it even deeper into the system. More seriously, while usurping this direct link, the virus rewrites itself using the vaccine, turning itself into a program that bypasses all of Yggdrasil's security measures. Exploiting the direct link between Belldandy and Yggdrasill, Celestin hacks deep into the system mainframe, accessing an enigmatic program that to this point is referred to only as top-secret. He possesses Keiichi and pulls the program through Belldandy, incorporating it into the vaccine mandala. This creates an enormous magical field that swallows the temple and the surrounding forest. Three enormous tree trunks spiral from the ground into the sky, and a gargantuan being slowly materialized.

In Belldandy's past, Celestin, concerned that the Gods were not listening to the suffering of those of the lower worlds, tried to rise up against them, first by destroying the Gate of Judgment. Heaven's agents are sent against him, but Belldandy manages to stop them, protecting her mentor. More people are sent, and both are restrained. Celestin was sentenced to eternity in the Lunar Prison, while Belldandy's memories of the events were to be erased by Urd.

If Celestin destroys Yggdrasil and the entire Earth, a new Earth, free of suffering, will have to be created. The three Goddesses stand united against Celestin and Morgan, trying to stop them. Back in the Heavens, Peorth authorizes the use of Gungnir to stop Celestin. She launches the attack, but Belldandy manages to protect him at the last minute: they may be attacking Celestin, but it is Keiichi that would be killed. Keiichi then helps Belldandy block the attack by borrowing Celestin's power (with his permission). Realizing he was wrong, Celestin finally concedes, and releases Keiichi from his body.

Soon after, Belldandy, Keiichi and Morgan are transported to the Gate of Judgement. Having once lost her love when trying to pass this test of the Gods, Morgan warns the two to not pass through it, but they move forward, with complete confidence they will pass through safely and not be separated. Upon stepping through the gate, they return to Earth. As they return, Morgan tells them that she will stay and tell couples who come in the future the story of how they passed the test. The two return, but back in the Heavens, Yggdrasil is critically damaged. The three goddesses and their angels come together to sing and rapidly restore The World Tree, before dematerializing it. Finally by herself, Belldandy informs Keiichi that the virus deleted Yggdrasil's records, meaning that he is once again free to ask for any wish. Smiling softly, he replies, "That's easy," sparking their love for one another once more. Up on a tree, Skuld wistfully wishes that she too will one day fall in love, just like Belldandy, only for Urd to state that she is a hundred years (then a million years, then a day) too young.

Cast

Soundtrack

The music was composed by Shirō Hamaguchi and conducted by Mario Klemens with performances by the Warsaw Philharmonic Orchestra. The main theme, Try to Wish, was performed by Saori Nishihata. The main theme was composed by Final Fantasy series composer Nobuo Uematsu. The soundtrack was released by Pony Canyon in Japan and Geneon Entertainment in North America.

Home video releases
November 27, 2001 (Pioneer)
November 8, 2005 (Geneon)

Reception

T.H.E.M. Anime Reviews described the animation and music of the movie as "absolutely beautiful", and gave the movie a perfect rating. Anime News Network praised the blend of CGI and cel artwork for the movie, and the casting choices for the dub. Sequential Tart criticised the film's lack of comedy and dub acting, but praised the artwork.

References

External links

 Official AIC Ah! My Goddess: The Movie page 
 Official Madman Entertainment Ah! My Goddess: The Movie page (Australian distributor)
 

2000 anime films
2000 films
Anime International Company
Arthurian animated films
Films scored by Shirō Hamaguchi
Films set in Chiba Prefecture
Geneon USA
Japanese comedy-drama films
Oh My Goddess!
Anime films based on manga